Luni is the name of two villages in Pakistan:

Luni (Balochistan)
Luni (Punjab)